This is a chronological summary of the expedition of Alexander the Great into Asia against the Persian Empire of king Darius III, with indication of the countries/places visited or simply crossed, including the most important battles/sieges and the cities founded (Alexandrias). The events of the expedition are shown in chronological order. For each event is given, separated by: 
 date of event, 
 places/cities crossed, indicated by ancient name (present name, country), 
 regions, provinces or Persian satrapies of the places/cities crossed, with indication of their capital cities (where appropriate).

Expedition

References

Bibliography

 Roger Caratini, Alessandro Magno, Storia e leggenda del più grande condottiero dell’antichità, Newton & Compton editori, 2005

External links

Wars of Alexander the Great